The Suite Life of Karan & Kabir is a Disney Channel India sitcom, which premiered on 8 April 2012. The series is an Indian adaptation of the American series The Suite Life of Zack & Cody.

Series overview

Season 1 (2012)

Season 2 (2013)

References

External links

Lists of Disney Channel television series episodes
The Suite Life series
Lists of Indian television series episodes
Lists of sitcom episodes
Disney Channel (Indian TV channel) original programming